East Asia Hotel () is a two-star hotel in Shanghai. It is located on Nanjing Donglu (Nanjing Road East).

History
In 1917, Ma Ying-piu, the son of a gold miner who went to Australia, constructed the five-story building Sincere Department Store on Nanjing Road. Ma started his first Since Store in Hong Kong, and the Nanjing location was a higher-caliber branch. Known as Shanghai Dongya Hotel, it occupied the highest parts of the building. It was split into a hotel called East Asia Hotel and a restaurant called East Asia Another Floor that specialized in Cantonese cuisine. The owner was Huang Huannan. According to the author Lingren Kong, "Based on the standards at the time, East Asia Hotel's facilities were first-class and it enjoyed a high reputation in Southeast Asia ... the East Asia Hotel was well-known in Shanghai." In 1980, the hotel had 150 rooms that spanned seven floors.

The hotel is located in Nanjing Donglu (Nanjing Road East) and is in a noisy part of city. At its tip, the building features a spire. East Asia Hotel is located in Sincere Store, a building that used to be a department store. A junk replica is at the exterior of the hotel, which partly covers it. It was called Jin Jiang East Asia Hotel in 2010. The hotel's employees are accustomed to Western guests. It has a restaurant called East Asia Restaurant that specializes in Huaiyang cuisine and serves breakfast and lunch tea. The hotel was rebranded to Jinjiang Inn.

Reception
Lonely Planet said "it's often booked out due to its prime location" and called the two-star hotel "clean and in good condition". Fodor's said the hotel "has long been a decent budget standby in the best part of the city".

See also
 Shanghai Bund
 Nanjing Road

References

External links
 

Hotels in Shanghai
Landmarks in Shanghai